Ptiliogonys is a genus of bird in the family Ptiliogonatidae.

Species
It contains the following species:

Bird genera
Ptiliogonatidae
Taxonomy articles created by Polbot